25 mm automatic air defense gun M1940 (72-K) was a Soviet 25 mm caliber anti-aircraft gun used during the Great Patriotic War. The gun was developed from the end of 1939 to the beginning of 1940 at 8th Kalinin Artillery Plant under the guidance of its Chief Designer Mikhail Loginov, supervised by Lev Loktev. The cannon was given the factory code 72-K before being accepted into service by the Red Army as the 25 mm automatic air defense gun M1940.

The gun borrowed a number of features from the older 37 mm automatic air defense gun M1939, such as mounting the gun on an integral four-wheel chassis (which came under criticism when compared to similar anti-aircraft guns from outside the Soviet Union). The gun itself generally satisfied the Army, and its ballistic performance was considered state-of-the-art on the world level.

The 72-K was designed for anti-aircraft defense for infantry regiments, occupying a place between the large-caliber DShK and the more powerful 37mm 61-K. However, due to difficulties in mass production, the 72-K did not reach the Red Army until the second half of the war. The 72-K and its paired-up variant, the 94-KM, were highly successful at engaging low-flying and diving targets, and continued to serve in the Red Army long after the end of the Great Patriotic War, before being replaced by the more modern ZU-23 in the first half of the 1960s.

History

Background
The Imperial Russian Armed Forces never had any automatic gun with a caliber lower than 37mm, with work on such guns beginning in the Soviet Union in the late 1920s, when the Kovrov mechanic factory developed its experimental 25mm automatic anti-aircraft gun. The 25mm caliber was never practically used before (except for the thirty-five Palmcrantz 25.4mm four-barreled rapid-firing cannons used on naval vessels in 1879). Later guns developed by Vasily Degtyaryov operated by tapping gas as it propels a shell forward to achieve automatic firing. Two such models were built, and were tested on carriages during 1929-1930, but they were not accepted for service.

What stimulated the development of such anti-aircraft guns was the quantitative and qualitative growth of aviation during the 1920s and the 1930s, and the resulting need to separate anti-aircraft artillery from the subordination hierarchy of the army. At that time, both rifle-caliber and large-caliber machine-guns and anti-aircraft guns of two caliber ranges - 20-25mm or 37-45mm - were considered for anti-aircraft use. At the same time, provisions of then-modern anti-air defense for the Red Army was deemed unsatisfactory; the USSR did not have any large-caliber machine-gun in service or in mass production in 1929, nor was there an anti-aircraft gun with a caliber of 20-25mm. The situation was no better for 37-45mm anti-aircraft guns; most weapons in service were obsolete World War I-era models, with attempts to even modernize the 37 mm anti-aircraft gun model 1928 ending in failure. With a similar issue taking place for field artillery, and given the weakness of Soviet design schools, foreign assistance was turned to for helping the development of artillery systems of a variety of classes and roles. The only foreign ally capable of doing so at that time, in the late 1920s, was the Weimar Republic, with whom the USSR had already signed a number of diplomatic and trade agreements.

Work on 20-23mm caliber guns
Rheinmetall (disguised as a shell company, Bütast) and the USSR signed a contract for supplying a number of artillery pieces (including automatic anti-aircraft guns) in 1930. In accordance with the terms set, Rheinmetall delivered two samples of a 20mm-caliber anti-aircraft guns to the USSR, alongside full design documents for the model. This model was accepted into service in the Red Army as the 20 mm automatic anti-aircraft and anti-tank gun model 1930. The Kalinin factory attempted to adopt mass production for this model, assigning it the factory code 2-K. However, the plant only managed to build three guns (originally having 100 in plans) in 1932, and 61 guns in 1933 before mass production ended—the plant never managed to master production of the gun; every unit was assembled by hand, with an extremely low overall quality. Only 31 units of 2-K anti-aircraft guns remained in service with the Red Army in 1936, barring 8 training guns. Germany adopted a modified version of this gun as the 2 cm Flugabwehrkanone 30.

Designers of the Kovrov plant proposed to adapt the 20mm ShVAK cannon for anti-aircraft use, which was tested on two different carriages in 1936, both ending in failure. Yakov Taubin's design bureau proposed to develop an anti-aircraft gun from its own 23mm MP-6 aircraft cannon. However, Taubin was arrested on May 16, 1941, which terminated further development of the still-half-developed gun.

Genesis

The Kalinin plant started work on a 25mm-caliber automatic anti-aircraft gun in 1939 meant for regiment-level use. The gun would borrow many of its components from the 61-K 37mm anti-air gun, which was already a finished design. The new design received the designation ZIK-25, and later, 72-K. The 72-K underwent factory tests on October 11, 1939, and later field tests from April 15 to May 25, 1940. Pronounced gun vibration and tracer cups detaching from shells were found during field tests, which prompted the development of new shells without such defects. These shortcomings did not interfere with the adoption of the gun, however, as it was accepted into service as the 25 mm automatic anti-aircraft gun model 1940 in the same year. Its chief designer, Loginov, did not live to see the gun enter mass production, as he died of tuberculosis on October 28, 1940. His post was taken by his deputy, Loktev, who also contributed greatly to the creation of the 72-K.

Improving the gun
The 72-K repeatedly received minor improvements in its design as it was mass-produced; these modifications were primarily aimed at smoothing mass production. An important innovation made in 1943 was the addition of a gun shield capable of withstanding rifle-caliber bullet impacts and small fragments, which assisted in the survival of the gun crew when exposed to small-arms fire and aircraft machine-gun/cannon fire to some extent.

The design bureau of plant No. 88 managed to pair up two 72-K cannons on a single carriage from the 94-K in late 1943, which passed field tests, was finalized, and was accepted into service as the 25 mm anti-aircraft gun model 1944 (94-KM). The same design bureau developed two more 25mm-caliber artillery pieces, the first of whom was known as the Z-5 quad-barrel anti-aircraft system, and the second one a mountain anti-aircraft battery. Neither was adopted.

Mass production

Serial production began at the Kalinin plant in 1941, with further developments of the gun delayed. However, by the beginning of the Great Patriotic War, there was not a single gun that passed military acceptance tests. After the outbreak of the war, additional problems associated with gun carriages were found, which were solved by outright mounting them on truck beds or armored trains. The Red Army received about 200 units of such improvised self-propelled 25mm anti-aircraft guns, mounted on a GAZ-MM chassis. Around 300 units were in service in total in 1941. Plant Nos. 172 and 4 joined in the production in 1942, but their manufacturing capabilities were far from enough: they could only manage 200 units per year altogether.

Plant No. 88 followed in 1943, which successfully solved the aforementioned issues alongside producing the gun in quantity and improving the design to facilitate mass production. It also built its own 94-KM in 1944-1945 by combining two 72-K cannons on a single 94-K carriage. Production of the 72-K ceased as the war ended, but there was no replacement in the Soviet Union; only in 1960 did the 72-K get replaced by the ZU-23(2A14).

Combat use
The 72-K is primarily used for anti-air duty against targets at a slant range of up to 2.4 km and an altitude of up to 2 km. Direct-firing against ground targets is also possible if necessary, the 25mm shells being capable of defeating light tanks and armored cars. Air defense units the gun was originally meant for was absent at that time, therefore the 72-K found itself in service in a variety of units, sometimes even replacing its bigger counterpart, the 37mm 61-K (in one case, the 32nd Tank Brigade had three 72-K guns in place of the 61-K). Some 72-K's were used for national air defense, both as stationary batteries and conventional installations (there was also a photo of 72-K being installed atop a city building). The 72-K was also used as anti-aircraft weapons for armored trains.

The Red Army did not receive any 20-25mm-caliber anti-air guns by June 22, 1941; Details of said anti-air guns in service, their losses, number produced and shells fired are given in the following table:

It is also worth noting that the 37mm 61-K was used on a much larger scale than the 72-K (by almost one order of magnitude)--37mm shells spent in 1944 amounted to a total of 7.1644 million, compared to only 707 thousand for 25mm shells.

Technical details
The 72-K is a single-barrel small-caliber automatic anti-aircraft gun mounted on an integral four-leg carriage, with a number of elements borrowed from the older 37mm 61-K. Full automation is accomplished by means of a recoiling barrel. The breech unlocks and opens as the barrel recoils backwards, and closes and locks after the recoiling movement is complete and the next round is fed. The bolt travels in unison with the barrel, which recoils back a short length (shorter than the shells). Shells are fed by a special feeding mechanism. The gun does not require manual input (aside from loading extra shells as previous ones are fired) to achieve automatic firing.

Technically the gun consists of the following:
The automation mechanism, which in turn includes:
The barrel (with the bolt)
Automatic feeding mechanism
Recoiling mechanisms
The gun cradle
Anti-aircraft sights
Gun carriage
Traverse mechanisms and gunshield

A typical gun crew for the 72-K consists of six men.

Barrel
The barrel assembly consists of the barrel proper, the breech and a flash-hider, with the barrel rifled for increased accuracy. The barrel is connected to the breech via a conical ramp, on which the first round of a magazine rests when loading the gun. Rifling consists of 12 grooves spanning 25 calibers at a 7°10' slope 0.29 mm deep and 4.4 mm wide. The bolt is 232 mm long with a volume of 120 cm3. The flash hider protects the gunner from being blinded when firing and also serves as a report damper. The barrel is 82.6 calibers (2.065 m) long without the flash hider, or 2.246 m with it. Total weight of the barrel mechanism, including recoil mechanisms and the flash hider is 43 kg. Due to high projectile velocities and high rate of fire, the barrel heats up and wears rather quickly, to counter which the barrel was made to be quickly replaceable by the gun crews. Average barrel life was 1200-1300 shots.

Breech and automatic feeding mechanism

The 72-K was equipped with a vertically falling wedge-shaped breech, which moves up and down in a slot as the weapon cycles. The gun cradle on the left of the breech has a "copier" that automatically unlocks the breech, near which a manual unlocking handle is also placed. The bolt consists of a locking mechanism, the firing pin, an ejector and a "copier", which allows for both automatic and single firing. The weapon would refuse to fire (with one last shell in the breech) should the loader fail to load another clip into the feed tray as the previous is expended. Firing would resume as soon as the next clip is loaded. The weapon is expected to be fed continuously as it fires from 7-round clips manually loaded to the feeding tray. Uninterrupted cyclic firing is possible so long as ammunition remains and the barrel does not overheat.

Recoiling mechanism

The 72-K has a hydraulic recoiling mechanism in addition to the recoiling barrel to absorb recoil forces, with a spring-loaded compensator to regulate hydraulic liquid volumes at 0.225 liters in the event of a barrel heat-up. The barrel recoils backwards anywhere from 118 to 136mm with a return spring installed.

Traverse

The upper part of the carriage houses the horizontal traverse mechanism, which allows for 360-degree traverse, while the lower part serves as support for the upper part. Units built from 1943 onwards also have a gun shield in place, which protects the crew from bullets and fragments. Horizontal and vertical traverse mechanisms are controlled from the right of the gun, with one revolution of the flywheel corresponding to a traverse of 7°30′ vertically, or 19°30′ horizontally.

Balance
To facilitate firing at high elevation angles, the trunnions of the carriage are positioned significantly backwards from the center of gravity of the traversing parts, which in turn disrupts the balance of the gun. To compensate for this, a spring-loaded mechanisms are installed on either side of the gun to exert a pull-back force.

Sights
The 72-K is equipped with an automatic anti-aircraft sight or a K8-T collimator sight (which comes with the earlier guns). The automatic sight provides a firing solution by calculating the impact point from provided data on the target's speed, slant range, speed, dive or pitch angle, with its accuracy largely dependent on whether the data was provided accurately (either by estimating the movement characteristics of the target by eye or by entering the data in a timely fashion). The automatic gunsight is designed for firing at slant ranges up to 2400 m with a target speed of 0 to 200 m/s at a maximum dive angle of 90° or a pitch angle of 60°. Automatic sights built before 1943 had some differences from later sights (in particular, different threading scales). Those without an automatic sight (mostly early guns) had a K8-T collimator sight, whose reticle provides a grid with two concentric rings corresponding to target speeds of 60 and 90 m/s.

Carriage

The gun carriage is four-wheeled with suspension systems for each wheel. The wheels are not displaced when the gun takes combat positions. The gun is usually installed with airless tires filled with spongy rubber. The carriage is usually divided into the frame, front and rear axles, the control mechanism, march/combat profile switches for the gun, and the four carriage legs.

The front axle of the carriage allows for changing the direction in which the gun is going when towed, and is pivotally connected to the frame with help from a balancer. The control mechanism is also connected to this axle. Suspension for each wheel is provided via shock-absorbing springs, independent of each other. The gun can be towed from either the front or rear via coupling devices.

For transitioning into combat position the gun is installed with special shock absorbers inside the beam of the chassis. Four men are needed to transition the gun in 40–45 seconds for experienced gun crews. The gun stands on four legs in combat positions, held level by four jacks, which allows the gun to be mounted on uneven terrain. Maximum speed for towing the gun is 60 km/h on asphalt roads, 45 km/h on cobblestone pavements, 30 km/h on formed dirt tracks and 15 km/h off-road.

Variants

Serial production
Guns made before 1943 do not have a gun shield and are fitted with a collimator sight.
Late-model 72-K's (from 1943 onwards) are fitted with a gun shield and improvements to facilitate mass production (partly associated with stamped or welded parts).
Dual-gun 94-KM built in 1944 by Plant No. 88 by mounting two 72-K's on a single 61-K chassis with a crew of nine, a gun shield and a transition time into combat profile of 30 seconds. Due to a number of defects (primarily inaccurate sights, muzzle smoke, frequent jams) the 94-KM was only built in small batches (totaling at 237 guns from 1944 to 1945).
Fixed installations (with wheels removed) to protect certain subjects of interest, also used by air defense forces.

Experimental
Quad-cannon Z-5 installation by the design bureau of Plant No. 88 from 1944 to 1945. Did not go into production.
An automatic mountain-range anti-air cannon (plans being approved on March 1, 1940) with a planned weight of less than 650 kg, a three-leg carriage, fed by 20-round magazines and towed by four horses or disassembled into 7-8 backpacks. Did not proceed beyond technical drawings.

Self-propelled anti-aircraft vehicles with 72-K mounted
Immediately before the Great Patriotic War, so-called "Anti-aircraft tanks" were considered for production. These tanks would have their regular turrets replaced with one specially designed for mounting anti-aircraft cannons or machine-guns. Among early projects was a T-50 tank mounting a 72-K-accommodating turret. This tank, designated the T-50-2, was abandoned as the war started.

GAZ-MM trucks mounting 72-K cannons were tested in late 1941, which completed successfully, and this improvised anti-aircraft truck was put into serial production at Kolomna Locomotive Works. A second incentive for its production was the fact that 72-K cannons mounted directly to the trucks do not need a gun carriage (which was plagued with problems then). Mass production ended in December 1941 after 200 such trucks were made for production evaluations. Another such anti-aircraft truck, mounting a 72-K on top of a ZiS-11, a lengthened ZiS-5 truck was designed as well.

Naval use
The Kalinin plant received a tactical-technical specification for a naval 25mm anti-aircraft cannon on March 25, 1940, which was given the factory code 84-K. The prototype was built and sent for testing in July, 1941. Essentially a modified 72-K, the 82-K was built with new balancing mechanism; counterweight loads were introduced on its carriage axles in place of the springs. It was successfully tested and recommended for production, but it was not mass-produced due to the Kalinin plant being evacuated. The gun was completed by designers at Plant No. 88, who created their own modification of the gun, the 84-KM. Naval tests for the gun were conducted in May, 1944, and the gun was accepted for service and went to mass production. 260 units were built in 1944, then a further batch of 70 units in 1945, after which mass production ended. The 84-KM saw service on a variety of vessels.

Plant No. 88 also designed a 25mm dual-barrel Z-1 anti-aircraft gun meant for submarines. It passed field tests at the end of 1944, but was not accepted into service and therefore not mass-produced.

Installation on armored trains
The 72-K was favored when it comes to arming armored trains. 40 units were delegated to such duties at the end of December 1941, every two being mounted on a special armored anti-aircraft position. The 72-K also paired up with other weapons sharing its position, such as the 37mm 61-K or the DShK machine-gun.

Ammunition and ballistic performance
Shells for the 72-K were of unitary designs, containing from bottom to top:
2.5 g of primer
100 g of Zh-132 propellent (grade 6/7 gunpowder)
2 g of coiled lead wire as pulverizer
A cardboard sealer with a central circular hole (for igniting the tracer)
The shell

The propellant charger is ignited via a KV-2 capsule hub. Shells were stored in 60-round boxes before being loaded into 7-round clips for combat use. The 72-K had a small range of ammunition types to use, including:
OZR-132 fragmentation-incendiary shell with tracer (FI-T)
BR-132 armor-piercing tracer shell (AP-T)
ZR-132 incendiary tracer shell (I-T)

The OZR-132 is mounted with a 24.7-gram K-20 fuse and a detonator meant for self-destruction should the shell fail to hit anything after about 5 seconds from firing. The BR-132 possesses a ballistic cap with a solid, blunt-headed projectile without any type of explosive or fuzing. An OZR-132 weighs 627 grams, whereas a BR-132 weighs 684 grams.

Evaluation 
The 72-K was intended for infantry regimental air defense as a lighter, more mobile counterpart of the heavier 61-K. Guns serving at this level (and usually finding themselves at the frontline) required compact sizes and light weights for easy concealment and maneuverability. The 72-K, due to its heavy four-wheeled carriage, is somewhat inconsistent with these requirements. Shirokorad argues that the 72-K was an erroneous development, which ought to be replaced by a lighter VYa cannon-based anti-aircraft gun with a detachable two-wheel carriage. In practical situations however, the 72-K usually found itself sharing the post with the 61-K, which was more effective but less maneuverable. Mass production of the 72-K only managed to get up to speed in 1943, which resulted in the Red Army having virtually no light anti-aircraft cannons during the first half of the Great Patriotic War.

Foreign analogues 

There are foreign counterparts of the 72-K serving in other countries, which were all mounted on a tripod with detachable carriages or other wheeled carriages. Such a design gave an undoubted advantage in terms of dimensions and weight, but the four-wheeled carriage of the 72-K could somewhat be a better solution when under sudden enemy air or ground attack, which enables it to return fire rather quickly—sometimes even without detaching itself from the tractor. While the 72-K's operating manual did not explicitly mention the steps needed to fire on the move, neither did it prohibit such use of the weapon.

Another advantage of the 72-K lies in its capability of uninterrupted firing, which is limited only by the skill of the loader and barrel heating, while many magazine-fed foreign analogues are interrupted in their firing sequences by their needs to have their magazines reloaded.

The Oerlikon 20mm cannon which had seen widespread use in the prewar years was developed from the Becker gun developed in the German Empire. Being banned from researching such weapons as the result of the Versailles Treaty, the Germans gave Swiss firm SeMAG (Seebach Maschinenbau Aktiengesellschaft) the necessary patents and technical drawings for the weapon for further development. SeMAG was incorporated into Oerlikon after its bankruptcy, which continued work on the gun. Anti-aircraft and aircraft versions of this gun became widely known in the world following its introduction, which were purchased by a number of countries, the US and the UK in particular. The Oerlikon 20mm cannon also had a number of field variants, including the 2 cm Flak 28 of Germany, the 2 cm VKPL vz. 36 of Czechoslovakia. The Oerlikon 20mm was inferior by more than 50% to the 72-K in terms of projectile weight (130 g versus 288 g) and muzzle velocity (850 m/s versus 910 m/s). This was compensated by the higher rate of fire of the Oerlikon, at 650 Rounds Per Minute, compared to only 240 of the 72-K. The United States noted the superiority of the Oerlikon over its Browning M2HB heavy machinegun in anti-aircraft duties, but eventually the Oerlikon gave way to other artillery systems; it was replaced in naval forces by the Bofors 40mm, and by a combination of 37mm and 12.7 mm guns in the Army, which are more powerful and effective means of short-range anti-aircraft defense than the Oerlikon. The UK utilized their own improved version of the Oerlikon, known as the Polsten, originally developed in Poland to simplify design and production costs. The gun was not yet complete when Poland was occupied, but the development team managed to flee to the United Kingdom and finish their design, which was adopted by the British Army in 1943 and put into mass production. The Polsten has a record low weight when in firing position—at only 231 kilograms in total, fed by 30 or 60-round magazines. Quad installations of the Polsten were also produced in addition to single-gun mounts alongside a special variant for paratroopers.
Another family of 20mm anti-aircraft cannons was the German 2 cm FlaK 38. Developed by Rheinmetall in 1930 for the USSR while at the same time unable to openly develop the weapon due to the Versailles Treaty (as was the case with the Becker gun), Rheinmetall delegated production to Solothurn of Switzerland. As the Nazi Party came to power and the Weimar Republic turned into the Third Reich, Adolf Hitler (then still chancellor) denounced all the prohibitive articles of the Versailles Treaty, and Rheinmetall's gun was adopted by the Kriegsmarine and the Luftwaffe as the 2 cm Flak 30. Compared to the later 72-K, the Flak 30 was not significantly superior in terms of ballistic performance or rate of fire, and in some aspects inferior to the former (with a projectile weight of 115-140 g, a muzzle velocity of 900 m/s and a cyclic rate of fire at 280 RPM), but lighter both on the go and in combat position with a two-wheel carriage. The Wehrmacht critically evaluated this, and instead adopted an alternative design from Mauser. The 2 cm FlaK 38 had the same ballistic performance and nearly twice the rate of fire (at 450 RPM) with an extended magazine (to 40 rounds). Generally the FlaK 38 was on equal terms with the 72-K in terms of muzzle velocity and one second burst-mass. The Flakvierling that appeared in 1940, combining four FlaK 38's into a single installation, brought about four times the firepower but an increase to 1,509 kg in combat position, to a further 2100 kg in travel positions. The FlaK 38 saw widespread use on half-track trucks or tanks.

By 1944, the Germans developed the Flak 103/38 automatic anti-aircraft gun, which is essentially a MK 103 cannon mounted atop a Flak 38 carriage. Closely matched in muzzle velocity and with a heavier projectile, in addition to higher rates of fire and being belt-fed, and smaller dimensions and weight, the MK 103 was a more effective anti-aircraft weapon than the 72-K. The MK 103 was also developed into another anti-aircraft gun, the MK 303 Br, with an even higher muzzle velocity (at 1080 m/s). The Germans however did not have time to launch mass-production; only 189 Flak 103/38's and 222 MK 303 Br's were built until the end of World War II, alongside a series of experimental 3 cm Flakvierling's featuring four Flak 103/38's. Both 20mm and 30mm German automatic anti-aircraft guns have a large range of ammunition types to choose from, which included sub-caliber armor piercing shells.

The French adopted the 25 mm Hotchkiss anti-aircraft gun for service in 1938, which had close muzzle velocity to that of the 72-K, used lighter projectiles, a lower rate of fire, and was fed from 15-round magazines, which took 3–4 seconds to change. However, the automatic mechanisms of the Hotchkiss gun was prone to failures, which often caused jams in combat. The Italian 20 mm Breda Model 35 and the Scotti gun both stand on a three-leg stand and are towed via a detachable two-wheel carriage. Both guns have close, but rather inferior ballistic performances to the 72-K, but come with better feed systems; the Scotti gun feeds from ammunition drums, while the Breda gun feeds from twelve-round clips which are loaded from one side and exits from the other to eject spent shell casings. Though inferior in terms of convenience of reloading, the Italian guns are superior to the 72-K in their smaller dimensions and lighter weights.

Japan used three models of 20–25 mm anti-air guns—the Type 2 20 mm AA machine cannon, the Type 98 20 mm AA machine cannon and the Type 96 25 mm AT/AA Gun, the Type 2 being essentially a Japanese variant of the Flak 38, while the Type 98 has inferior ballistic performances and a higher rate of fire compared to the 72-K. However, the Type 98 feeds from 20-round magazines which reduces its practical rate of fire. Both the Type 2 and the Type 98 are significantly lighter than the 72-K, while the Type 96, a 25 mm dual-purpose cannon, is essentially a Japanese Hotchkiss gun.

Surviving examples
The 72-K can be found in the Military Historical Museum of Artillery, Engineers and Signal Corps in Saint Petersburg and the Museum of the Great Patriotic War in Moscow, alongside its paired-up sister gun, the 94-KM.

See also 
 Type 61 - A shortened Chinese variant.

References

External links
Soviet 25mm Anti-Aircraft gun(Automatic gun) 72-K Model 1940 – Walk around photos

Anti-aircraft guns of the Soviet Union
World War II artillery of the Soviet Union
25 mm artillery
World War II anti-aircraft guns
Weapons and ammunition introduced in 1941